Lucidella lirata is a species of gastropods belonging to the family Helicinidae.

The species is found in America.

References

Helicinidae